A steak knife is a sharp table knife used for cutting steak or other meat. It may also refer to:

 Stakeknife, a spy
 Steakknife, a German punk rock band